Ben George Barnicoat (born 20 December 1996) is a British racing driver.  He is a Lexus Racing USA factory racing driver, making his IMSA SportsCar Championship debut in 2022. He returns for a second season with Lexus and Vasser Sullivan Racing, and kicked off the 2023 IMSA SportsCar Championship with a podium finish at the 24 Hours of Daytona.

Starting out in karting, Barnicoat stormed through the ranks, becoming multiple British and European champion before graduating to single seaters, where he scored multiple race victories. After a transition into GT racing, Barnicoat held the role of Factory Driver with McLaren for four years, enjoying further successes on a global level while also playing an integral role in the development of the McLaren 720S GT3 racecar. 

He has also competed in a variety of other championships and formulas, including the World Endurance Championship, European Le Mans Series, and finished as runner up in the Asian Le Mans Series LMP2 class on his class debut.

Career

Karting
Born in Chesterfield, Barnicoat began his racing career in karting at the age of nine. In 2007 he clinched the WTP Cadet Open and Motors TV Cadet Karting Championship titles as well as becoming WTP "Little Green Man" Vice Champion. In 2008 he graduated to KF3 category in which he participated in the MSA Formula Kart Starts championship and Kartmasters GP. He did remarkably well in both, securing 4th in Formula Kart Stars and 7th at Kartmasters. Barnicoat returned the year after and won Kartmasters GP, Formula Kart Stars and finished Vice-Champion in the Super One Junior Championship. By 2012, Barnicoat had claimed the CIK-FIA KF2 European Championship too. In 2015 Barnicoat claimed the Kart Masters GP Trophy in both the Senior Rotax and Iame X30 class, becoming the first driver to take two Kart Masters Championships in one day. Barnicoat has since continued to compete in the Kart Masters event and is now the most successful driver with 9 titles to his name. Claiming Snr X30 in 2017/18/19 and snr rotax too in 2019.

Formula Renault
In 2013 Barnicoat made his début in single-seaters, taking part in the Protyre Formula Renault Autumn Cup for Fortec Motorsports, and won the cup with two wins.

Barnicoat continued his collaboration with Fortec into 2014, competing in the Formula Renault 2.0 NEC and Formula Renault 2.0 Alps series.

European Formula 3
On 15 November 2015, it was announced that Barnicoat would race with Prema Powerteam for the 2016 season. However, it was later announced that Barnicoat would switch to race with HitechGP.

Sportscar career
Barnicoat made the transition from single-seaters across into GT racing in 2017. The following six seasons have seen him compete - and win - on some of the biggest stages in motorsport. Appointed Factory Driver with McLaren a year later, Barnicoat took on the pivotal role in the development of the brand’s latest range of GT racing cars. Barnicoat has also proven himself on the world stage with podium results at the Bathurst 12 Hour, Asian Le Mans Series, Intercontinental GT Challenge, GT World Challenge Europe, Pirelli World Challenge & the British GT Championship in both GT3 and GT4 classes, as well as back-to-back outright victories at the Gulf 12 Hours.

In 2019, Barnicoat also made his LMP2 debut with Thunderhead Carlin Motorsport, competing in the European Le Mans Series, and finishing as runner up in the Asian Le Mans Series with two victories during the season. 

2022 saw Barnicoat appointed as Factory Driver with Lexus Racing USA and Vasser Sullivan Racing, contesting the IMSA WeatherTech SportsCar Championship with the Lexus RC F GT3. In his debut season, Barnicoat scored notable victories, including a season finale victory at Petit Le Mans, en route to finishing 2nd in the championship. 

Alongside this impressive debut season, 2022 also saw Barnicoat secure the Asian Le Mans Series GT3 title, he successfully defended his title at the Gulf 12 Hours with 2 Seas Motorsport, and campaigned at the 24 Hours of Le Mans for a second year. 

He returns to the US in 2023 for a second season with Lexus Racing and Vasser Sullivan.

FIA Formula 3 Championship
On 30 July 2020, Carlin Buzz Racing announced that Enaam Ahmed and his sponsors had separated from the team, and that Barnicoat would be replacing him at the team. In four races, he scored one point - a 10th place finish in the first race of Silverstone.

Other racing activities
On 20 November 2021, Barnicoat raced a BriSCA F1 Stock Car at Skegness Stadium. He won the Consolation event, which allowed qualification for the meeting Final event, in which he finished in second place.

Racing record

Career summary

† As Barnicoat was a guest driver, he was ineligible for points.

Complete Formula Renault 2.0 Northern European Cup results 
(key) (Races in bold indicate pole position; races in italics indicate fastest lap)

Complete Eurocup Formula Renault 2.0 results
(key) (Races in bold indicate pole position) (Races in italics indicate fastest lap)

Complete FIA Formula 3 European Championship results
(key) (Races in bold indicate pole position) (Races in italics indicate fastest lap)

Complete GT World Challenge Europe Sprint Cup results

† Driver did not finish the race, but was classified as he completed over 90% of the race distance.

Complete British GT Championship results
(key) (Races in bold indicate pole position) (Races in italics indicate fastest lap)

Complete European Le Mans Series results
(key) (Races in bold indicate pole position; results in italics indicate fastest lap)

Complete FIA Formula 3 Championship results
(key) (Races in bold indicate pole position) (Races in italics indicate fastest lap)

Complete 24 Hours of Le Mans results

Complete IMSA SportsCar Championship results
(key) (Races in bold indicate pole position; races in italics indicate fastest lap)

* Season still in progress.

Complete FIA World Endurance Championship results
(key) (Races in bold indicate pole position; races in italics indicate fastest lap)

References

External links

Profile on Racing Steps Foundation site

Living people
Sportspeople from Chesterfield, Derbyshire
1996 births
English racing drivers
Formula Renault 2.0 NEC drivers
Formula Renault 2.0 Alps drivers
British Formula Renault 2.0 drivers
Formula Renault Eurocup drivers
FIA Formula 3 European Championship drivers
FIA Formula 3 Championship drivers
Blancpain Endurance Series drivers
24 Hours of Spa drivers
British GT Championship drivers
International GT Open drivers
European Le Mans Series drivers
Euroformula Open Championship drivers
Asian Le Mans Series drivers
FIA World Endurance Championship drivers
24 Hours of Le Mans drivers
Carlin racing drivers
WeatherTech SportsCar Championship drivers
W Racing Team drivers
Hitech Grand Prix drivers
Strakka Racing drivers
Teo Martín Motorsport drivers
Jota Sport drivers
Fortec Motorsport drivers
Formula Renault BARC drivers
McLaren Racing drivers
Le Mans Cup drivers